The 1920 Texas Longhorns football team represented the University of Texas at Austin in the 1920 college football season. In their first year under head coach Berry Whitaker, the Longhorns compiled an undefeated 9–0 record, shut out six of nine opponents, and outscored all opponents by a collective total of 282 to 13.

The meeting of Texas and Texas A&M in 1920 is said to have really started the rivalry. Both teams were undefeated and the game featured the largest crowd in state history. Texas won 7–3. The game turned on a play where the Longhorns' tackle declared himself eligible for a pass.

Schedule

References

Texas
Texas Longhorns football seasons
Southwest Conference football champion seasons
College football undefeated seasons
Texas Longhorns football